Rise Records is an American record label currently based in Beaverton, Oregon, mainly focusing on alternative rock, heavy metal, and punk rock music artists.

History
Rise was founded in 1991 by Craig Ericson in Nevada City, California. He released a small number of 7" records before putting the label on hiatus to attend college. Ericson didn't release anything further until 1999, after moving to Portland, Oregon. He began issuing small-print 7" records, and his first CD release came in 2000, from the group One Last Thing. The label gave a strong foundation to bands Anatomy of a Ghost, Ever We Fall (who later signed with Hopeless) and Fear Before the March of Flames (who signed to Equal Vision).  Later signees (e.g.  Breathe Carolina, The Devil Wears Prada and Drop Dead, Gorgeous), gained considerable popularity while with Rise, and moved on to what were larger labels at the time (Interscope, Fearless and Ferret, respectively).  Rise has also signed some veteran bands, including Hot Water Music, Bouncing Souls, The Bled, Bleeding Through and From First To Last.

Rise Records' releases are distributed in the U.S. by ADA and BMG. In July 2013, the company moved from Portland to neighboring Beaverton, Oregon. The label has a distribution deal with Alternative Distribution Alliance, the indie distributor owned by Warner Music Group and directly in Europe and Australia with Warner Music and BMG.

On 9 September, Australian label UNFD announced a distribution partnership with Rise. On 18 May 2015, BMG announced the acquisition of the label. Rise will maintain its headquarters and Ericson will remain in charge. BMG will help with back office operations and provide Rise a more international reach.

On 8 December 2017, Craig Ericson announced his departure from the label. Sean Heydorn stepped up and took over Rise Records.

In 2020 Rise Records moved their operation into the BMG Los Angeles office, located at 5670 Wilshire Blvd, where Sean Heydorn continues to oversee the label today.

On February 18, 2021, Rise Records announced a partnership with Blue Swan Records which is founded by Dance Gavin Dance guitarist Will Swan.

Artists

Current artists

 The Acacia Strain
 AFI
 American Nightmare
 Angels & Airwaves
 Billy Howerdel
 Bloodbather
 Chapel
 Clint Lowery
 Cold Collective
 Covey
 Crown the Empire
 Dance Gavin Dance
 Dave Hause
 Derek Sanders
 The Distillers
 Flogging Molly
 Galactic Empire
 Gone Is Gone
 Jetty Bones
 Kublai Khan
 Kvelertak
 Le Butcherettes
 LGND
 Mark Morton
 Mayday Parade
 Memphis May Fire
 Merci
 Morgan Rose
 Mothica
 Placebo
 Polyphia
 PUP
 Sevendust
 Social Animals
 SPITE
 Tiger Army
 Tilian
 You Me at Six

Blue Swan Records artists
 Body Thief
 Eidola
 Royal Coda
 Wolf & Bear

Pale Chord Artists
 Harper
 Paloma
 Spiritbox
 Thousand Below

Former artists

 7 Seconds (active)
 A Different Breed of Killer (active, unsigned)
 Abandon All Ships (disbanded)
 Acceptance (active, Tooth & Nail Records)
 The Air I Breathe (active, unsigned)
 Alive Like Me (disbanded)
 American Me (active, unsigned)
 Arlington (active, unsigned)
 Ashland
 At the Drive-In (disbanded)
 Attack Attack! (active, Oxide Records)
 At the Throne of Judgment (active, unsigned)
 Before Their Eyes (active, InVogue Records)
 Black Peaks (disbanded)
 The Bled (disbanded)
 Bleeding Through (active, SharpTone Records)
 Blessthefall (disbanded)
 The Bouncing Souls (active, Pure Noise Records)
 Breathe Carolina (active, Spinnin' Records)
 Burden of a Day (disbanded)
 Buried in Verona (disbanded)
 Cane Hill (active, Out of Line Music)
 Casey (disbanded)
 Catherine (disbanded)
 Cheap Girls (disbanded)
 Chelsea Grin (active, unsigned)
 Circa Survive (on hiatus)
 Cockpunch (inactive)
 Coretta Scott (disbanded)
 The Color Morale (active, Fearless Records)
 Cursed Sails (disbanded)
 DangerKids (active, Paid Vacation Records)
 Dead Letter Circus
 Decoder (disbanded)
 The Devil Wears Prada (active, Solid State Records)
 Dream On, Dreamer (disbanded)
 Drop Dead, Gorgeous (disbanded)
 Dualesc (disbanded)
 The Early November (active, Pure Noise Records)
 Eighteen Visions (active, unsigned)
 Emarosa (active, Out of Line Music)
 Ever We Fall (disbanded)
 Evergreen Terrace
 Exotype (active, unsigned)
 Farewell My Enemy (disbanded)
 Fear Before (disbanded)
 Fire from the Gods (active, Better Noise Music)
 The Flatliners (active, Dine Alone Records)
 For the Fallen Dreams (active, Arising Empire)
 From First to Last (active, Sumerian Records)
 Further Seems Forever
 Face to Face (active, Fat Wreck Chords)
 Goldfinger (active, Big Noise)
 Hand of Mercy (disbanded)
 Hands Like Houses (active)
 Here I Come Falling (disbanded)
 Hot Water Music (active, Equal Vision Records)
 I Can Make a Mess
 In Fear and Faith (on hiatus)
 In Hearts Wake (active, UNFD)
 Isles & Glaciers (disbanded, vinyl release only)
 Issues (inactive)
 It Prevails (active, Stay Sick Recordings)
 The Jealous Sound (disbanded)
 Jonny Craig 
 Kevin Seconds
 Knuckle Puck (active, Wax Bodega)
 Light Up the Sky (disbanded)
 Like Moths to Flames (active, UNFD)
 The Living End
 Make Do and Mend
 Make Them Suffer (active, Greyscale)
 Makeout (active, unsigned)
 Man Overboard
 Matty Mullins (active in Memphis May Fire & on Black River Entertainment)
 MikeyWhiskeyHands
 Miss May I (active, SharpTone Records)
 The Movielife (active, unsigned)
 My Ticket Home (active, Spinefarm Records)
 Northlane (active, Worldeater Records)
 Oceana (now known as Polyenso)
 Of Machines (disbanded)
 Of Mice & Men (active, SharpTone Records)
 Only Crime
 Orange Island (disbanded)
 Palisades (disbanded)
 Piebald 
 The Plot in You (active, Fearless Records)
 PMtoday (disbanded)
 Poison the Well
 Polar Bear Club (on hiatus)
 Pvris (active, Hopeless Records)
 Rarity
 The Red Shore (disbanded)
 Scarlett O'Hara
 Secrets (active, Velocity Records)
 Sharks (disbanded)
 Silverstein (active, UNFD)
 Sleeping with Sirens (active, Sumerian Records)
 Small Towns Burn a Little Slower (disbanded)
 Storm the Sky (disbanded)
 SWMRS (active, Fueled by Ramen)
 T.S.O.L.
 Take the Crown (disbanded)
 Teenage Bottlerocket (active, Fat Wreck Chords)
 That's Outrageous! (disbanded)
 This Is Hell
 Tides of Man (active, unsigned)
 Transit (disbanded)
 Tyler Carter
 Up to Here (disbanded, Eating Blur Records)
 Valleyheart
 Watch It Burn (disbanded)
 Woe, Is Me (active)
 Your Demise (disbanded)

See also
List of record labels

References

External links

American record labels
Alternative rock record labels
Hardcore record labels
Companies based in Beaverton, Oregon
Oregon record labels
Punk record labels
Record labels established in 1991
Privately held companies based in Oregon
1991 establishments in California
American companies established in 1991